Austrfararvísur (‘verses of an eastern journey’) is a skaldic poem composed by the Icelandic skald Sigvatr Þórðarson c. 1019. It is written in the meter dróttkvætt (‘courtly spoken’).

Historical context
Sigvat was a court poet and trusted advisor of King Olaf Haraldson of Norway. He was sent with a diplomatic delegation to the court of King Olof of Sweden. The delegation was successful. Reconciliation was achieved between the two kings, sealed with engagement between Olaf II and the Swedish princess Astrid Olofsdotter of Sweden.

Content
Austrfararvísur contains a humorous and sarcastic description of Sigvat's arduous journey to Svíþjóð, modern eastern Sweden. In one particularly memorable sequence, he describes how the men passed though Eidskogen into Västergötland, and reached a farm named Hof (for its identity see Fulk 2012, p. 589). The door was barred, and the people inside hostile; due to being Christian, Sigvat and his retinue were not welcome. According to the prose context and alluded to in the poem, Sigvat went on to ask for lodging at two other homesteads, but were likewise refused at each. The relevant verses (4-6) from the poem in Fulk's edition (pp. 589-592):

 I resolved to aim for Hof; the door was barred, but I made enquiries from outside; resolute, I stuck my down-bent nose in. I got very little response from the people, but they said [it was] holy; the heathen men drove me off; I bade the ogresses bandy words with them.

 ‘Do not come any farther in, wretched fellow’, said the woman; ‘I fear the wrath of Óðinn; we are heathen.’ The disagreeable female, who drove me away like a wolf without hesitation, said they were holding a sacrifice to the elves inside her farmhouse.

 Now three namesakes have driven [me] away, they who turned their backs on me; not at all do the firs of the whetstone-platform [SWORD > MEN] display praiseworthiness. However, I fear this above all, that every loader of the ocean-ski [SHIP > SEAFARER] who is named Ǫlvir will henceforth chase strangers away.

See also
 Ragnvald Ulfsson

References

Editions and translations
 
 Om skalden Sighvat Thordsson och tolkning af hans Austrfararvísur, Vestrfararvísur och Knútsdrápa (author: Sighvatr Þórðarson; editor: Sven Alfred Ternström, publisher:Lund, H. Ohlssons boktryckeri, 1871. text in Old Norse with Swedish introduction, translation and notes )

Other sources
 Jonsson, Finnur (1907) Den islandske litteraturs historie tilligemed den old norske (University of California Libraries)  
 Lagerqvist,Lars O. (1982) Sverige och dess regenter under 1.000 år (Albert Bonniers Förlag AB)  
 Thunberg, Carl L. (2012) Att tolka Svitjod [To interpret Svitjod] (Göteborgs universitet CLTS) ,

External links
 The poem in Old Norse, two editions
 In Praise of Ástríðr Óláfsdóttir (Judith Jesch -  University of Nottingham)



11th-century poems
Skaldic poems
Sources of Norse mythology